Pieces of Eight is the eighth studio album by American progressive rock band Styx, released on September 1, 1978.

Like the band's previous album, The Grand Illusion (1977), it managed to achieve triple platinum certification, thanks to the hit singles "Blue Collar Man (Long Nights)" and "Renegade".

The band members produced and recorded the album (like their previous three efforts) at Paragon Studios in Chicago with recording engineer Barry Mraz and mixing engineer Rob Kingsland. "I'm O.K." was recorded at Paragon and St. James Cathedral. This would be the last Styx album to be produced at Paragon Studios.

The album's cover was done by Hipgnosis. Dennis DeYoung stated in the 1991 interview with Redbeard on the In the Studio with Redbeard episode that he initially hated the cover but grew to like it as he got older.

Background
The record is considered by some to be Styx's most obvious concept album, as well as the last Styx album with significant progressive rock leanings. The theme of the album, as Dennis DeYoung explained on In the Studio with Redbeard which devoted an entire episode to Pieces of Eight, was about "not giving up your dreams just for the pursuit of money and material possessions".

Critical reception

Mike DeGagne of AllMusic has retrospectively praised the album, saying that the songs on the album "rekindle some of Styx's early progressive rock sound, only cleaner." Contemporary Rolling Stone reviewer Lester Bangs was more critical of the album, however, saying that "What's really interesting is not that such narcissistic slop should get recorded, but what must be going on in the minds of the people who support it in such amazing numbers. Gall, nerve and ego have never been far from great rock & roll. Yet there's a thin but crucial line between those qualities and what it takes to fill arenas today: sheer self-aggrandizement on the most puerile level. If these are the champions, gimme the cripples."

The album peaked at #6 on the Billboard album chart, and like its predecessor would go triple platinum.

Track listing

Personnel

Styx
 Dennis DeYoung –  vocals, keyboards
 James "JY" Young – vocals, electric guitars
 Tommy Shaw – vocals, electric and acoustic guitars, mandolin, autoharp
 Chuck Panozzo – bass guitar
 John Panozzo – drums, percussion

Production
 Producer: Styx
 Engineers: Rob Kingsland, Barry Mraz
 Assistant engineer: Harry Andronis
 Mastered by Ted Jensen at Sterling Sound, NYC
 Cover by Hipgnosis

Charts

Weekly charts

Year-end charts

Certifications

Singles

References

External links 
 Styx - Pieces of Eight (1978) album review by Mike DeGagne, credits & releases at AllMusic.com
 Styx - Pieces of Eight (1978) album releases & credits at Discogs.com
 Styx - Pieces of Eight (1978) album to be listened as stream at Spotify.com

1978 albums
Albums with cover art by Hipgnosis
A&M Records albums
Concept albums
Styx (band) albums